Irish Premier League may refer to:
 NIFL Premiership, formerly the Irish Premier League, a Northern Ireland association football league
 Super League (Ireland), formerly the Premier League, an Irish basketball league

See also
 League of Ireland Premier Division, a Republic of Ireland association football league